Unakkaagave Vaazhgiren is a 1986 Indian Tamil-language film, directed by K. Rangaraj, starring Sivakumar, Nadhiya and Suresh. The film was a remake of the Malayalam film Shyama. It marked the 20th & last Tamil film as a leading actress for Menaka G. Suresh, after which she would make a comeback to the Kollywood industry 25 years later in the 2010s era.

Plot 
Siva Kumar is a leading music director in the Tamil film industry. After his wife Menaka's death, he stopped composing music and prefers to stay away from society. One day, he gets a letter from his music teacher (Ra. Sankaran), who stays in Ooty. Siva Kumar leaves to Ooty to meet his guru. Sankaran advises Siva Kumar to come out of sorrow and start concentrating on music again. He also requests him to stay in Ooty for a few days so that it will help him overcome the pain. Siva Kumar agrees and stays in Sankaran's friend's (Raveendar) guest house. Nadiya is the only sister of Raveendar. Siva Kumar visits Raveendar's house and plays a veena there. Nadiya suddenly gets angry and shouts at Siva Kumar not to play that. Later Nadiya feels bad for her rude behaviour and apologizes to Siva Kumar.

Slowly Siva Kumar and Nadiya become good friends. There comes a flashback for Nadiya. Suresh is Nadiya's relative and they both were in love. But one day suddenly, Suresh dies in an accident. Nadiya is shocked by Suresh's death and she cannot recover from that. Following that, Nadiya prefers to stay without marrying anyone. Similarly Siva Kumar tells his flashback where his wife Menaka dies when the gas cylinder suddenly explodes at his home.

Friendship transforms into love between Siva Kumar and Nadiya. But Siva Kumar understands that it was only he, who hit Suresh in an accident a few years back, following which he died. This makes him feel guilty and he refuses the marriage with Nadiya. Nadiya meets Siva Kumar and asks for the reason. Siva Kumar confesses the truth.

Siva Kumar's wife was badly hurt following cylinder explosion. Siva Kumar was driving his car fast as he needs to admit her soon to the hospital. On the way, he hit Suresh who was riding a bike. Suresh was also badly hurt and requests help. Siva Kumar at that moment tries to save only his wife and he leaves Suresh without helping. Suresh dies there. Siva Kumar's wife also passes away. Now Siva Kumar says to Nadiya that though it was an accident, he feels guilty of killing a human and that's why he refuses marriage with Nadiya. Though Nadiya gets angry first, later she understands Siva Kumar's position and the two get married.

Cast 

Sivakumar as Ravishankar
Nadiya Moidu as Chitra
Suresh as Vijay
Menaka as Sakunthala
Raveendran as Vishnu
Chinni Jayanth
Kullamani
Ra. Sankaran as Krishnamurthy sashtriyar
Senthil as Pattukottai
Typist Gopu

Soundtrack 
The soundtrack was composed by Ilaiyaraaja and the lyrics were written by Muthulingam, Gangai Amaran and Vairamuthu.

Reception
Jayamanmadhan of Kalki wrote the story gets stuck in a loop. Here and there it loses balance. If Dinesh Babu had failed to give pleasantness in Kodaikanal and Ilayaraja had failed to give sweetness to the auditory nerves, the front half would have been sitting on a thorn. It is a pity that even they could not save the second half. He called Sivakumar's flashback as generous but felt the scenes involving Suresh and Nadhiya were superficially treated.

References

External links 
 

1986 films
Films scored by Ilaiyaraaja
Tamil remakes of Malayalam films
1980s Tamil-language films
Films directed by K. Rangaraj